Elymnias singhala, the Ceylon palmfly, is a butterfly in the family Nymphalidae. It was described by Frederic Moore in 1875. It is endemic to Sri Lanka in the Indomalayan realm.

References

External links
"Elymnias Hübner, 1818" at Markku Savela's Lepidoptera and Some Other Life Forms

Elymnias
Butterflies described in 1875
Butterflies of Sri Lanka
Taxa named by Frederic Moore